Valdosta Regional Airport  is a public-use airport located three nautical miles (6 km) south of the central business district of Valdosta, a city in Lowndes County, Georgia, United States. It is owned by the Valdosta-Lowndes County Airport Authority. The Valdosta Regional airport is mostly used for general aviation, but is also served by Delta Air Lines, which offers service to Atlanta. The airport also offers free parking.

Facilities and aircraft
It has three asphalt paved runways: 17/35 measuring 8,002 x 150 ft. (2,439 x 46 m), 4/22 measuring 5,598 x 100 ft. (1,706 x 30 m), and 13/31 measuring 3,636 x 75 ft. (1,108 x 23 m).

After the completion of runway 17/35 in the summer of 2007, Valdosta now has the third longest runway in the state of Georgia (excluding military bases). The longest runway is at Hartsfield-Jackson Atlanta International Airport and the second longest is at the Savannah/Hilton Head International Airport.

For the 12-month period ending May 31, 2007, the Valdosta Regional airport had 73,565 aircraft operations, an average of 201 per day: 55% general aviation, 41% military, 3% air taxi and 1% scheduled commercial. At that time there were 53 aircraft based at this airport: 68% single-engine, 28% multi-engine and 4% jet.

Daily air service is provided to Atlanta by Delta Connection, utilizing Canadair Regional Jet 200 aircraft.

In July 2018, a new passenger boarding bridge, or jet bridge, was added to the terminal building. It remained unused for over a year, after a piece was installed upside down. The bridge is currently in use as of June 2021.

History
Opened in April 1940, the airport was taken over by the United States Army Air Corps in 1941.   During World War II, the airport was used as an auxiliary airfield for Moody Army Airfield, supporting the Army pilot training school.  The airport was returned to civil control at the end of the war.

Airline and destination

Top destinations

See also

 Georgia World War II Army Airfields

References

External links
 Valdosta Regional Airport, official website
 Owens Aircraft
 Valdosta Aero Testing Center
 
 
 

 
Airfields of the United States Army Air Forces in Georgia (U.S. state)
Airports in Georgia (U.S. state)
 
Buildings and structures in Lowndes County, Georgia
Transportation in Lowndes County, Georgia
Airports established in 1940
1940 establishments in Georgia (U.S. state)